Leonard B. Kaban, D.M.D., M.D., F.A.C.S. is the Walter C. Guralnick Professor and Chair of the Department of Oral and Maxillofacial Surgery at the Massachusetts General Hospital/Harvard University. Considered to be a pioneer in oral, maxillofacial and craniofacial surgery, Dr. Kaban has pioneered many techniques for facial skeletal reconstruction. He is perhaps most well known for his contributions to the field of maxillofacial distraction osteogenesis and surgical correction of hemifacial microsomia.

Biography

Education
Dr. Kaban received both his doctor of dental medicine (D.M.D.) and doctor of medicine (M.D.) degrees from Harvard University. He completed his residency training in general surgery/oral and maxillofacial surgery at the Massachusetts General Hospital.

Career
He remained in Boston following the completion of his training and was an integral part of the Craniofacial Centre at Boston Children's Hospital between 1973 and 1984. He subsequently was the Chair of the Department of Oral and Maxillofacial Surgery at the University of California, San Francisco, before returning to Harvard in 1994.

Dr. Kaban has received intramural and extramural funding for research endeavors that have led to publication of approximately 250 articles in peer-reviewed journals, numerous abstract presentations, and three textbooks related to complications in oral and maxillofacial surgery and pediatric oral and maxillofacial surgery.

References

External links
 Massachusetts General Hospital, Department of Oral and Maxillofacial Surgery

Living people
Harvard Medical School alumni
American surgeons
Harvard Medical School faculty
Harvard School of Dental Medicine alumni
Year of birth missing (living people)